Sylhet cinema bombings refers to the bombing of two cinema halls in Sylhet.

Background 
In 2002, cinema halls were targeted in Satkhira bombings and Mymensingh cinema bombings. The early 2000s saw a number of bomb attacks in Bangladesh.

In May 2004, there was a bomb attack on the British High Commissioner to Bangladesh, Anwar Choudhury, while he was visiting a shrine, Shah Jalal Dargah, in Sylhet. J. Cofer Black, Ambassador-at-Large and Coordinator for Counterterrorism, was visiting Bangladesh on 5 August 2004.

History 

On 5 August 2004, two bombs exploded at Rangmahal Cinema and Monika Cinema in Sylhet five minutes apart. A 12-year-old boy died in the explosions and 20 other were injured in Rangmahal Cinema  and five people were injured in the explosion at Monika Cinema. An unexploded explosive was recovered from another cinema hall in Sylhet called  Abokash Cinema that day.

The unexploded bomb was recovered by a team of Bangladesh Army from Dhaka who safely detonated it on the grounds of Lakkatura Golf Club. Mokhlesur Rahman, Sub-Inspector of Bandarbazar police outpost, filed a case over the blasts and suspected Shahid, the 12 year blast victim, was the bomb carrier. Shahid's father and three others were detained but no leads were found. Morshed, Sub-Inspector of Kotwali Police Station, filled another case over the blast. The suspects were interrogated in Dhaka by Joint Interrogation Cell. Police detained an Awami League politician briefly.

The responsibility of the case was shifted to Criminal Investigation Department and Assistant Superintendent of Police Munshi Atiqur Rahman. After Rahman retired the investigation was taken over by Inspector Zobayer who filed charges against one named Soleman.

References 

2004 in film
2004 murders in Bangladesh
21st-century mass murder in Bangladesh
Attacks on buildings and structures in Asia
Attacks on cinemas
August 2004 crimes
August 2004 events in Asia
Explosions in 2004
Islamic terrorism in Bangladesh
Islamic terrorist incidents in 2004
Improvised explosive device bombings in Bangladesh
Mass murder in 2004
Massacres in Bangladesh
Cinema bombings
Terrorist incidents in Bangladesh in 2004
Terrorism in Bangladesh
Building bombings in Bangladesh